Vannvåg is a village in Karlsøy Municipality in Troms og Finnmark county, Norway.  The village is located along the Ullsfjorden on the southeastern shore of the island of Vanna.  The Vannvåg School is the primary school for the eastern part of Vanna island.  There is also a fish farm in the village.  The harbour in Vannvåg is newly rebuilt in 2015.

During the middle ages, there was a church in Vannvåg, but it was likely closed and torn down during the 1600s.

References

Villages in Troms
Karlsøy